Party In Backyard is a Dutch YouTuber and record producer based in Eindhoven, Netherlands.

In 2018, Party In Backyard released a joint single with Swedish YouTuber PewDiePie, called "Bitch Lasagna". The song reached number 18 on the UK Independent Singles and Album Breakers Charts. Later that year, Party In Backyard's remix of "Hej Hej Monika" was counted among the most popular YouTube clips in Sweden for 2018.

Party In Backyard and PewDiePie again teamed up in 2019 with the single "Mine All Day". The song peaked at number 3 on the US Comedy Digital Track Sales published by Billboard.

Discography

References

Dutch YouTubers
Musicians from Eindhoven
Living people
Year of birth missing (living people)
Music YouTubers
YouTube channels launched in 2012